Daisy and Simon is a 1988 Australian film shot in Perth. It is also known as Where the Outback Ends.

It was first announced in 1983 as Daisy then in 1985 as The Distance with Michael York.

References

External links
Daisy and Simon at IMDb
Daisy and Simon at Oz Movies

Australian drama films
Films shot in Perth, Western Australia
1980s English-language films
1980s Australian films